Acetohalobium arabaticum is the type species of the genus Acetohalobium.  It is a prokaryote that can expand its genetic code from 20 to 21 amino acids (by including pyrrolysine) under different conditions of growth.

Strains
Strain Z-7288 (= DSM 5501 = ATCC 49924) is the type strain of the species.

See also
 Genetic code

References

External links
 Complete genome sequence of Acetohalobium arabaticum type strain (Z-7288)
Type strain of Acetohalobium arabaticum at BacDive -  the Bacterial Diversity Metadatabase

Halanaerobiales